Anthony Eugene Morgan (born November 15, 1967) is a former professional American football wide receiver in the National Football League (NFL). He played six seasons for the Chicago Bears (1991–1993) and the Green Bay Packers (1993–1996). He is perhaps best known for his performance versus Detroit during the 1994 season, in which he hauled in 6 passes for 103 yards and two touchdowns 

After his playing career ended, in September 1998, Morgan joined the Christian Valley Missionary Baptist Church and became an ordained minister in 2006. In July 2012, Morgan became the wide receivers coach at Trinity International University.

References

1967 births
Living people
American football wide receivers
Chicago Bears players
Green Bay Packers players
Tennessee Volunteers football players
Players of American football from Cleveland
John Adams High School (Ohio) alumni